Tai Hing (South) is an at-grade MTR Light Rail stop located at Tai Fong Street near Tai Hing Commercial Centre, Tai Hing Estate, in Tuen Mun District. It began service on 18 September 1988 and belongs to Zone 2. It serves the south of Tai Hing Estate.

References

MTR Light Rail stops
Former Kowloon–Canton Railway stations
Tuen Mun District
Railway stations in Hong Kong opened in 1988
MTR Light Rail stops named from housing estates